Sucralose is an artificial sweetener and sugar substitute. The majority of ingested sucralose is not broken down by the body, so it is noncaloric. In the European Union, it is also known under the E number E955. It is produced by chlorination of sucrose, selectively replacing three of the hydroxy groups in the C1, C4, and C6 positions to give a 1,6-dichloro-1,6-dideoxyfructose–4-chloro-4-deoxygalactose disaccharide. Sucralose is about 320 to 1,000 times sweeter than sucrose, three times as sweet as both aspartame and acesulfame potassium, and twice as sweet as sodium saccharin.

While sucralose is largely considered shelf-stable and safe for use at elevated temperatures (such as in baked goods), there is some evidence that it begins to break down at temperatures above . The commercial success of sucralose-based products stems from its favorable comparison to other low-calorie sweeteners in terms of taste, stability and safety. It is commonly sold under the Splenda brand name.

Uses
Sucralose is used in many food and beverage products because it is a no-calorie sweetener, does not promote dental cavities, is safe for consumption by diabetics and nondiabetics, and does not affect insulin levels, although the powdered form of sucralose-based sweetener product Splenda (as most other powdered sucralose products) contains 95% (by volume) bulking agents dextrose and maltodextrin that do affect insulin levels. Sucralose is used as a replacement for (or in combination with) other artificial or natural sweeteners such as aspartame, acesulfame potassium or high-fructose corn syrup. It is used in products such as candy, breakfast bars, coffee pods, and soft drinks. It is also used in canned fruits wherein water and sucralose take the place of much higher calorie corn syrup-based additives. Sucralose mixed with dextrose or maltodextrin (both made from corn) as bulking agents is sold internationally by McNeil Nutritionals under the Splenda brand name. In the United States and Canada, this blend is increasingly found in restaurants in yellow packets.

Cooking
Sucralose is available in a granulated form that allows same-volume substitution with sugar. This mix of granulated sucralose includes fillers, all of which rapidly dissolve in water. While the granulated sucralose provides apparent volume-for-volume sweetness, the texture in baked products may be noticeably different. Sucralose is not hygroscopic, which can lead to baked goods that are noticeably drier and manifest a less dense texture than those made with sucrose. Unlike sucrose, which melts when baked at high temperatures, sucralose maintains its granular structure when subjected to dry, high heat (e.g., in a 180 °C or 350 °F oven). Thus, in some recipes, such as crème brûlée, which require sugar sprinkled on top to partially or fully melt and crystallize, substituting sucralose does not result in the same surface texture, crispness, or crystalline structure.

Safety evaluation
Sucralose has been accepted as safe by several food safety regulatory bodies worldwide, including the U.S. Food and Drug Administration (FDA), the Joint FAO/WHO Expert Committee Report on Food Additives, the European Union's Scientific Committee on Food, Health Protection Branch of Health and Welfare Canada, and Food Standards Australia New Zealand. According to the Canadian Diabetes Association, the amount of sucralose that can be consumed over a person's lifetime without any adverse effects is 900 milligrams per kilogram of body weight per day.

In a review of sucralose's safety, the FDA states that it "reviewed data from more than 110 studies in humans and animals. Many of the studies were designed to identify possible toxic effects including carcinogenic, reproductive and neurological effects. No such effects were found, and FDA's approval is based on its finding that sucralose is safe for human consumption." In reviewing a 1987 food additive petition by McNeil Nutritionals, the FDA stated that "in the 2-year rodent bioassays ... there was no evidence of carcinogenic activity for either sucralose or its hydrolysis products ..."

The FDA approval process indicated that consuming sucralose in typical amounts as a sweetener was safe. The intake at which adverse effects are seen is 1500 mg/kg BW/day, providing a large margin of safety compared to the estimated daily intake. Most ingested sucralose is directly excreted in the feces, while about 11–27% is absorbed by the gastrointestinal tract (gut). The amount absorbed from the gut is largely removed from the blood by the kidneys and eliminated via urine, with 20–30% of absorbed sucralose being metabolized.

Research revealed that when sucralose is heated to above 120 °C (248 °F), it may dechlorinate and decompose into compounds that could be harmful enough to risk consumer health. The risk and intensity of this adverse effect is suspected to increase with rising temperatures. The German Federal Institute for Risk Assessment published a warning that cooking with sucralose could possibly lead to the creation of potentially carcinogenic chloropropanols, polychlorinated dibenzodioxins and polychlorinated dibenzofurans, recommending that manufacturers and consumers avoid baking, roasting, or deep frying any sucralose-containing foods until a more conclusive safety report is available.  Furthermore, adding sucralose to food that has not cooled was discouraged, as was buying sucralose-containing canned foods and baked goods.

As of 2020, reviews of numerous safety and toxicology studies on sucralose concluded that it is not carcinogenic.

History
Sucralose was discovered in 1976 by scientists from Tate & Lyle, working with researchers Leslie Hough and Shashikant Phadnis at Queen Elizabeth College (now part of King's College London). While researching novel uses of sucrose and its synthetic derivatives, Phadnis was told to "test" a chlorinated sugar compound. Phadnis thought Hough asked him to "taste" it, so he did. He found the compound to be exceptionally sweet.

Tate & Lyle patented the substance in 1976; as of 2008, the only remaining patents concern specific manufacturing processes.

These effects have not been reported in humans. An expert panel, including scientists from Duke University, Rutgers University, New York Medical College, Harvard School of Public Health, and Columbia University reported in Regulatory Toxicology and Pharmacology that the Duke study was "not scientifically rigorous and is deficient in several critical areas that preclude reliable interpretation of the study results".

Sucralose was first approved for use in Canada in 1991. Subsequent approvals came in Australia in 1993, in New Zealand in 1996, in the United States in 1998, and in the European Union in 2004. By 2008, it had been approved in over 80 countries, including Mexico, Brazil, China, India, and Japan. In 2006, the FDA amended the regulations for foods to include sucralose as a "non-nutritive sweetener" in food. In May 2008, Fusion Nutraceuticals launched a generic product to the market, using Tate & Lyle patents.

In April 2015, PepsiCo announced that it would be moving from aspartame to sucralose for most of its diet drinks in the U.S. due to sales of Diet Pepsi falling by more than 5% in the U.S. The company stated that its decision was a commercial one, responding to consumer preferences.

In February 2018, PepsiCo went back to using aspartame in Diet Pepsi because of an 8% drop in sales for the previous year.

Chemistry and production

Sucralose is a disaccharide composed of 1,6-dichloro-1,6-dideoxyfructose and 4-chloro-4-deoxygalactose. It is synthesized by the selective chlorination of sucrose in a multistep route that substitutes three specific hydroxyl groups with chlorine atoms. This chlorination is achieved by selective protection of one of the primary alcohols as an ester (acetate or benzoate), followed by chlorination with an excess of any of several chlorinating agent to replace the two remaining primary alcohols and one of the secondary alcohols, and then by hydrolysis of the ester.

Storage
Sucralose is stable when stored under normal conditions of temperature, pressure and humidity. Upon prolonged heating during storage at elevated temperatures (38°C, 100°F), sucralose may break down, releasing carbon dioxide, carbon monoxide and minor amounts of hydrogen chloride.

Effect on caloric content
Though sucralose contains no calories, products that contain fillers such as dextrose and/or maltodextrin add about 2–4 calories per teaspoon or individual packet, depending on the product, the fillers used, brand, and the intended use of the product. The FDA allows for any product containing fewer than five calories per serving to be labeled as "zero calories".

Research
There is no evidence of an effect of sucralose on long-term weight loss or body mass index, with cohort studies showing a minor effect on weight gain and heart disease risks. But, results, published on 15 March 2023 in Nature, suggest that the sweetener has a clear biological effect beyond stimulating taste, as evidence show, - beyond sucralose alter people’s gut microbes, and by this significantly impair glycemic responses, by affecting glucose absorption in the intestinal tract as well as insulin and incretin secretion in humans and animals owing to changes in the gut microbiota, and also affect the fluidity of cell membranes, - that the intake of high doses of sucralose in mice results in immunomodulatory effects, as it also impair the T cells’ ability to replicate and specialize by limiting T cell proliferation and T cell differentiation. Mechanistically, sucralose affects the membrane order of T cells, accompanied by a reduced efficiency of T cell receptor signalling and intracellular calcium mobilization, also suggest that it could be used to tamp down conditions that cause a hyperactive immune system, like type 1 diabetes. Beside this, chronic administration of sucralose intake induces an overexpression of ΔFosB in the infralimbic cortex (Cx), nucleus accumbens (NAc) core, shell, and central nucleus of amygdala (Amy), that induce long-term changes in the reward system.

Environmental effects 
According to one study, sucralose is digestible by a number of microorganisms and is broken down once released into the environment. However, measurements by the Swedish Environmental Research Institute have shown sewage treatment has little effect on sucralose, which is present in wastewater effluents at levels of several μg/L (ppb). No ecotoxicological effects are known at such levels, but the Swedish Environmental Protection Agency warns  a continuous increase in levels may occur if the compound is only slowly degraded in nature. When heated to very high temperatures (over 350 °C or 662 °F) in metal containers, sucralose can produce polychlorinated dibenzo-p-dioxins and other persistent organic pollutants in the resulting smoke.

Sucralose has been detected in natural waters, but research indicates that the levels found in the environment are far below those required to cause adverse effects to certain kinds of aquatic life.

See also 
 Erythritol and Xylitol
 Neotame, PureVia, Stevia, and Truvia
 Tagatose
 N-Acylethanolamine

References 
Footnotes

Citations

Sugar substitutes
Disaccharides
Food additives
Organochlorides
E-number additives